BCU may refer to:

Computing 
 BIOS configuration utility
 Bus Coupling Unit, an EIB/KNX bus coupler
 IBM Balanced Configuration Unit

Universities and libraries 
 Bengaluru City University, formerly Bengaluru Central University, in Karnataka, India
 Bethune–Cookman University
 Birmingham City University
 Briar Cliff University
 Business and Computer University, Lebanon
 Cantonal and University Library of Lausanne, Switzerland (Bibliothèque cantonale et universitaire de Lausanne)

Other uses 
 Awad Bing language (ISO 639-2 code "bcu")
 Babish Culinary Universe, a YouTube cooking channel 
 Banco Central del Uruguay, official name in Spanish of the Central Bank of Uruguay
 Basic command unit
 British Canoeing AKA British Canoe Union
 IATA airport code for Bauchi State Airport, Nigeria